Gamma 1, released in 1979, is Gamma's debut album. It reached No. 131 on the Billboard Album charts, totalling seventeen weeks on the survey. "I'm Alive" reached No. 60 on the Billboard singles charts. "I'm Alive" is a cover of The Hollies song from 1965.

Track listing
Credits adapted from the original LP releases.
Side one
"Thunder and Lightning" (Ronnie Montrose, Davey Pattison) – 4:37
"I'm Alive" (Clint Ballard Jr.) – 3:18
"Razor King" (Montrose, Pattison) – 5:53
"No Tears" (Pattison) – 4:53

Side two
"Solar Heat" (Montrose) – 3:09
"Ready for Action" (Montrose) – 3:39
"Wish I Was" (Mickey Newbury) – 5:16
"Fight to the Finish" (Montrose, Jim Alcivar) – 6:25

Personnel
Davey Pattison – vocals
Ronnie Montrose – guitar
Jim Alcivar – keyboards
Alan Fitzgerald – bass guitar
Skip Gillette – drums

Production
Ken Scott – producer, engineer 
Brian Leshon, Phil Jost – assistant engineers
Bernie Grundman – mastering at A&M Studios, Los Angeles

References 

Gamma (band) albums
1979 debut albums
Albums produced by Ken Scott
Elektra Records albums